Charles Musgrave is an American chemist, engineer and materials scientist. He won the 1993 Foresight Institute Feynman Prize in Nanotechnology.

He earned his Ph.D. at the California Institute of Technology in 1994, his B.S. at the University of California at Berkeley and was a postdoctoral fellow at the Massachusetts Institute of Technology. He previously taught chemical engineering and materials science and engineering at Stanford University and chemistry at Harvard University. He currently teaches at the University of Colorado, Boulder, where he is professor, Associate Dean for Graduate Education in the College of Engineering and Applied Science and served as the chair of the Department of Chemical and Biological Engineering from 2016 to 2020.

His field of research involves using computational quantum mechanical and machine-learning methods to model molecular processes and materials. The goals of his research include the discovery and design of materials for catalysis, energy conversion and storage as well as the chemistry of microelectronics, nanofabrication and polymerization.

References

External links

Year of birth missing (living people)
Living people
21st-century American chemists
California Institute of Technology alumni
University of California, Berkeley alumni
University of Colorado Boulder faculty